Hunter is a 1973 film directed by Leonard Horn and written by Cliff Gould, starring John Vernon, involving the kidnapping and brainwashing of a race car driver in order to turn him into an assassin against America. The torture used against him involves forcing him to watch footage of the Winged monkeys from The Wizard of Oz, a-la A Clockwork Orange, giving rise to the now-famous pop-culture catch phrase "Please, stop the monkeys!"

External links

1973 films
Films scored by Lalo Schifrin
American thriller films
1970s thriller films
Films directed by Leonard Horn
1970s American films